Kemar Thompson (a.k.a. Noncowa, a.k.a. Jr. Pinchers) (born 10 October 1982, Jamaica) is a Jamaican reggae and dancehall artist. His is the eldest son of reggae mainstay Pinchers.

References

External links
 Kemar Thompson Bio
 Kemar Thompson MySpace Page

1982 births
Living people
Jamaican reggae musicians